Tarakani-ye Pain (also Romanized as Tarākānī-ye Pā’īn; also known as Tarākānī-ye Soflá, Tarākānī, Tarkanj, and Tarkūnj) is a village in Baqeran Rural District, in the Central District of Birjand County, South Khorasan Province, Iran. At the 2006 census, its population was 22, in 11 families.

References 

Populated places in Birjand County